VCL may refer to:

Computing
 Varnish Configuration Language, a domain-specific language used for configuring the Varnish Proxy / Server
 Video Coding Layer, a layer in H.264/AVC and HEVC
 Virus Creation Laboratory, an MS-DOS program designed to create computer viruses
 Visual Component Library, a programming library for Delphi and C++Builder
 Visual Class Library, an internal part of OpenOffice.org and LibreOffice
 Voluntary collective licensing, an alternative approach to solve the problem of software piracy

Other uses
 Vinculin, a mammal protein
 Vickers-Carden-Loyd tankette, a British tankette
 Voluntary Committee of Lawyers, a former organization to repeal prohibition of alcohol in the US
 Vampire Cheerleaders, a manga series
 Chu Lai Airport (IATA code: VCL)